The Giophyros or Platyperama is a river near Iraklion, Crete. Its ancient name was the Triton.

References

 Aikaterini Laskaridis Foundation, "Triton R. (Crete) 3 Platyperama/Giophyros - Τρίτων", Topos Text, https://topostext.org/place/353253WTri

Rivers of Crete